Wört is a municipality (German: Gemeinde) and town in the district of Ostalbkreis in Baden-Württemberg in Germany.

Geography

Location 
Wört is located in the valley of the Rotach, a tributary of the Wörnitz River, in the Virngrund region. It is in the northeastern foothills of the Swabian Alb range, between Dinkelsbühl (6 km) and Ellwangen (13 km).

Neighboring Towns 
The municipality is bordered to the north by Fichtenau, part of Schwäbisch Hall district, to the east by the Bavarian city of Dinkelsbühl, to the south by Stödtlen and to the west by Ellenberg.

Land Use 
According to the Baden-Württemberg Statistics Office, the total area of the municipality is 18.17 km2 (7.02 sq mi), of which 8.13 km2 (45%) is woodland, 7.67 km2 (42%) is agricultural, 0.9 km2 (5%) is buildings, 0.74 km2 (4%) is for transportation, 0.62 km2 (3.5%) is water and 0.09 km2 (0.5%) is for recreational use.

Notable residents 
It is the birthplace of church historian Hubert Wolf (born 1959).

References

Ostalbkreis
Württemberg